Brotogeris is a genus of small parrots endemic to Central and South America. Their closest relatives are the monk parakeet and the cliff parakeet in the genus Myiopsitta. They eat seeds and fruit. The word brotogeris means "having the voice of a human". In the language of their native countries, which is mostly Spanish, they are called pericos – the translation of which is "parakeet". Their average lifespan is 15 years, although some have been reported to have lived up to 35 years. Also, the bird was found in Rio Grande do Sul in South America.

Taxonomy
The genus Brotogeris was introduced in 1825 by Irish zoologist Nicholas Aylward Vigors with the grey-cheeked parakeet as the type species. The name is from the Ancient Greek brotogērus meaning "with human voice".

The genus contains eight species:

Phylogeny
The species form a monophyletic group whose closest relatives are the monk parakeet and the cliff parakeet in the genus Myiopsitta. Within Brotogeris the species are divided into two separate clades.

Gallery

References

Further reading
Bencke, Glayson A., 2010.New and significant bird records from Rio Grande do Sul, with comments on biogeography and conservation of the southern Brazilian avifauna. IHERINGIA SERIE ZOOLOGIA, 100(4), 391–402. 10.1590/S0073-47212010000400014

 
Psittacidae
Birds described in 1825
Bird genera
Taxonomy articles created by Polbot